Joseph Billington was an English footballer. He played one Football League game for Blackpool in 1902, his only known professional first-team appearance. The game in question was at Leicester Fosse on 15 March 1902. The hosts won by a single goal.

References

Year of birth missing
English footballers
Blackpool F.C. players
Year of death missing
Association football outside forwards